Hari Krishan Lal Bhagat (4 April 1921 – 29 October 2005) was an Indian politician of the Congress party. He served as the Deputy Mayor and Mayor of Delhi, the Chief Whip of Delhi Pradesh Congress Committee (DPCC), and as a six-time MP and Union minister for 22 years. Bhagat was commonly known for being a loyalist to Indira Gandhi and maintained firm success in Delhi and the Congress Party until the 1990s. His possible role in the 1984 anti-Sikh Riots is controversial, though he was cleared by the Government due to witness testimony in three trials. Bhagat and the Indian Congress Party's legacy has vastly affected the politics of India and has been subjected to debate and study.

Career 
Bhagat moved to Delhi in 1947 and quickly became active in the politics of the area. A strong Indira Gandhi loyalist, and strong leader in Delhi in the 1970s and 1980s, Bhagat won six consecutive elections by large margins, and was responsible for a Congress comeback in the 1980 and 1983 elections in Delhi. He was known to have a strong group in the Congress Party, and won his first Lok Sabha election in 1971 from the East Delhi constituency in Delhi. He grew in political stature after Congress' victory in the local elections of 1983 which led him to be known as the ‘Uncrowned King of Delhi’ for many a years. He held ministerial positions, including of Information and Broadcasting, Parliamentary Affairs and Law, and made the state-run TV "Doordarshan" the Congress party's mouthpiece during the mid to late 1980s.

Bhagat's career declined after losing from East Delhi in 1991. Towards the end of his political career, he was named by the Nanavati Commission for an alleged involvement in the 1984 Anti-Sikh Riots. The government ultimately declined to prosecute Bhagat because of his poor health by that time. He was acquitted by the courts in both cases citing lack of evidence as many witnesses including his security personnel testifying that Bhagat was next to late PM Indira Gandhi's body for 3 days and did not leave her premises. The then Lieutenant Governor of Delhi also testified to Nanavati commission that HKL Bhagat called him multiple times asking for the Army to be brought in.

Bhagat died in a hospital after prolonged illness and he was suffering from Alzheimer's disease. He is survived by his son, DPCC gen secretary Deepak Bhagat.

References

External links
 A short profile at The Tribune site
 Times Of India Report on 1984 Anti-Sikh Pogroms 
 

Indian National Congress politicians
1984 anti-Sikh riots
Mayors of Delhi
1921 births
2005 deaths
India MPs 1971–1977
India MPs 1980–1984
India MPs 1984–1989
India MPs 1989–1991
Lok Sabha members from Delhi
People from East Delhi district
Ministers for Information and Broadcasting of India
Tourism ministers of India
Members of the Cabinet of India